The Thai Game is a breed of hard feather fighting chicken, originating in Thailand, and known as . Since 2009 they have been recognised by the British Poultry Standards. They are described as of Malayoid type, with similarities to Shamo but with a lighter build and higher positioned tail as the most obvious differences. Any colour is accepted, but red black is the most common.

References

Chicken breeds originating in Thailand
Chicken breeds